The Collapsium is a 2000 hard science fiction novel by Wil McCarthy, the first in the Queendom of Sol series.  The first section of the novel is based on McCarthy's short story "Once Upon a Matter Crushed", which was a Sturgeon Award finalist.  A reviewer stated McCarthy used postmodern literary technique in consciously creating a protagonist who is a "throwback" to the scientist-heroes of Golden Age SF.

It was nominated for 2002's Nebula Award for Best Novel.

References

2000 American novels
2000 science fiction novels
American science fiction novels
Novels by Wil McCarthy
Hard science fiction
Del Rey books
Fiction about black holes